Zhuravel is a Ukrainian and Belarusian surname from a nickname meaning "crane" in both languages. Notable people with the name include:

 Tony Zhuravel (1963), Belarusian contemporary artist
 Uladzimir Zhuravel (1971–2018), Belarusian football player and coach

See also
 

Belarusian-language surnames
Ukrainian-language surnames
Surnames from nicknames